Rajapur Union is a union parishad situated at Mohammadpur Upazila,  in Magura District, Khulna Division of Bangladesh. There are 11 villages and 10 mouzas in the union.

References

External links
 

Unions of Khulna Division
Unions of Mohammadpur Upazila
Unions of Magura District